This is a list of current and former shipping companies authorized by the Maritime Industry Authority of the Philippines:

References

 
Shipping companies
Philippines
Shipping